Dachi may refer to:
Dachi, Fujian (大池镇), town in Xinluo District, Longyan, Fujian, China
Dachi, Shaanxi (大池镇), town in Zhenba County, Shaanxi, China
Dachi, Iran, village in Khuzestan Province, Iran
Dachi of Iberia (reign 522–534)
A series of Karate stances